Mihăilești is a town located in Giurgiu County, Muntenia, Romania. It administers three villages: Drăgănescu, Novaci and Popești. It officially became a town in 1989, as a result of the Romanian rural systematization program.

It was created as part of the Danube–Bucharest Canal project and feeds a hydro-electric plant.

Popești village is the location of an important archeological discovery: a large Dacian settlement believed by some historians such as Vasile Pârvan and professor Radu Vulpe to be the Argedava mentioned in the Decree of Dionysopolis. This ancient source links Argedava with the Dacian king Burebista, and it is believed to be his court or capital.

See also 
 Argedava

References

External links 

 A fost Argedava (Popesti) resedința statului geto-dac condus de Burebista? - Article in Informația de Giurgiu (Romanian)

Towns in Romania
Populated places in Giurgiu County
Localities in Muntenia
Archaeological sites in Romania
Ruins in Romania
Dacian sites